is a  mountain in Ōtsu, Shiga Prefecture, Japan. This mountain is one of the 200 famous mountains in Japan and also one of the Kinki 100 mountains.

Outline 
Mount Bunagatake is the highest mountain of Hira Mountains. Hira mountains consist of three parts, Oku-Hira, Kita-Hira and Minami-Hira, literally, ‘Deep Hira’, ‘North Hira’, and ‘South Hira’. Mount Bunagatake belongs to Oku-Hira, and on the Mesozoic strata as other mountains of Oku-Hira.
This mountain is also a part of Biwako Quasi-National Park, and visitors can enjoy the almost 360 degree panorama view from the top.

Access 

From Hira Station to the middle of this mountain, Hira Chair Lift, which was made in 1960, and Hira Ropeway opened in 1961, connected until 2004 with a Bus route by Kojyaku Bus. However the chair lift and the ropeway were removed in 2004, and the Bus route was also discontinued after that.

Hira Station of Kosei Line
Bomura Bus Stop of Kyoto Bus

Image gallery

References
the Geographical Survey Institute in Japan
Biwako Quasi-National Park
‘Hirasankei Bunagatake’

External links

Bunagatake, Mount
Ōtsu